Shanawaz Allyboccus (born 12 July 1984) is a Mauritian footballer who played as a defender for AS Rivière du Rempart. He won two caps for the Mauritius national football team in 2002.

References

1984 births
Living people
Mauritian footballers
Mauritius international footballers
Association football defenders
AS Rivière du Rempart players